A Maddux, in baseball statistics, is when a pitcher throws a shutout of nine or more innings with fewer than 100 pitches. Writer Jason Lukehart invented the statistic in 2012 and named it after his favorite baseball player, Greg Maddux. Fittingly, Greg Maddux has the most career Madduxes with 13, since 1988 when accurate pitch counts were tracked. Zane Smith has the second-most career Madduxes, seven, and shares the single-season record for Madduxes with Greg Maddux, three each. Shelby Miller and Derek Holland are the leaders among active players, with three each. The 1988 season had the most Madduxes with 25, while 2018 had the fewest with just two thrown. Roy Halladay is the only player to have thrown an extra-inning Maddux, throwing 99 pitches in 10 innings on September 6, 2003.

References 

Pitching statistics
Baseball terminology
2012 introductions